Watcharapon Changklungmor (born June 30, 1988) is a Thai professional footballer who plays as a right-back.

References

External links
 

1988 births
Living people
Watcharapon Changklungmor
Association football defenders
Watcharapon Changklungmor
Watcharapon Changklungmor
Watcharapon Changklungmor
Watcharapon Changklungmor